Michael Ryan Caldwell (born August 26, 1989) is an American entrepreneur and the Mayor of Woodstock, Georgia. He has served as a member of the Board of Directors of the Georgia Technology Authority since October 15, 2020, and a former Republican member of the Georgia House of Representatives for the 20th district between January 13, 2013, and January 11, 2021. He is also the cofounder and the Partner for Operations and Business Development at Black Airplane, an award-winning digital product company headquartered in Woodstock, Georgia.

Biography

Education
Caldwell graduated from Etowah High School in Woodstock, Georgia in 2007. He then earned his Business Finance degree from Kennesaw State University in 2010.

Family
Michael was raised in Woodstock, Georgia after living around the country. He married his high school sweetheart Katie, and they have three children. The Caldwells live in downtown Woodstock.

Work and career
Michael Caldwell is a cofounder, owner and Partner for Operations and Business Development at Black Airplane, an award-winning creative software development firm that builds apps and websites, since May 2017. Previously, Caldwell was a member of the founding team and partial owner at Python Safety, Inc. which specialized in "Fall Protection for Tools" and was acquired by 3M in 2015. He authored the most widely adopted dropped object prevention procedure in the world and spent years traveling the globe speaking on this topic.

Mayor of Woodstock, Georgia 
In August, 2021 Michael Caldwell was the sole qualifying candidate to become the Mayor of Woodstock, Georgia and became the Mayor-elect. He assumed office as the 31st Mayor on January 1, 2021.

Georgia State Senate Candidacy (2019 - 2020)
In January 2019 Caldwell announced that he would be seeking election to the State Senate in Georgia's 21st district in the 2020 election cycle. He was defeated by incumbent state Senator Brandon Beach on June 9, 2020.

Georgia State House of Representatives (2013–2021)
In September 2011, Caldwell announced his candidacy for the 20th District of the Georgia State House of Representatives in the 2012 election cycle. Caldwell ran on the platform of  accountable, honest, and transparent government. In the primary election that followed in July, 2012, Caldwell defeated Byrd by winning 53.36% of the total vote to secure the Republican nomination. Caldwell went on to defeat the Democratic nominee in the general election in November, 2012 winning 77.11% of the total vote. He then  won re-election in 2014 and 2016 without opposition in the primary or general elections, and defeated the Democratic nominee in November, 2018 with 69.91% of the total vote.

Ethics and campaign finance reform
Michael Caldwell was well known for refusing to accept campaign contributions or gifts from registered lobbyists or individuals from outside the State of Georgia. All of his campaign income and expenditure information was accessible via the "Finance Tracker" tool on his website. Constituents were also able to learn about Caldwell's reasoning behind his votes by accessing the "Legislative Tracker" segment of his website.

Committee assignments
Caldwell served as a member of the following Committees:

1.     Code Revision - Vice Chairman

2.     Economic Development and Tourism - Member

3.     Regulated Industries - Member

4.     Budget and Fiscal Affairs Oversight - Member

5.     State Planning & Community Affairs - Member

6.     Interstate Cooperation - Member

References

1989 births
Living people
People from Cherokee County, Georgia
Kennesaw State University alumni
Republican Party members of the Georgia House of Representatives
People from Woodstock, Georgia
21st-century American politicians